Bachiarius was an early fifth-century Christian writer, known only through his two writings which suggest he was a Galician monk.

Writings
"Liber de Fide" - an apologetic letter to the Pope.
"Ad Januariam liber de reparatione lapsi" - an appeal to an abbot on behalf of an incontinent monk.

References

Roman Catholic monks
5th-century Latin writers